Sweatsuit may refer to :

 Sweatsuit, a set of exercise clothing comprising a sweatshirt and sweatpants
 Sweatsuit (album), 2005, by American rapper Nelly